Woodmont Academy was a private school in Howard County, Maryland, affiliated with the Legionaries of Christ, a Catholic religious institute.

History
Woodmont Academy was founded in 1995 by the Legionaries of Christ in Granite, Baltimore County, Maryland.  There were 49 students in the first class.

Plans to relocate to Glenwood were cancelled in 2000 when local residents objected. The school chose an alternate  site in Cooksville, to which it relocated in 2003 over similar local opposition.

In 2010, the Vatican condemned Marcial Maciel, the former leader of the Legion, for molesting underage males and fathering at least one child of a student.

Due to declining enrollment (falling from 301 to 160 in two years), economic conditions, and fallout from the Legion of Christ controversy, Woodmont Academy closed on June 10, 2011, after the 2010–11 school year.  At the time of the closure, the school was apparently planning to change from Legion of Christ controlled to a lay-led institution.

Curriculum
The school used the "Integral Foundation" curriculum emphasizing character development.

Redevelopment
In 2013, former James N. Robey aide Sang Oh representing Dar-us-Salaam, an Islamic organization that operates Al Huda School in College Park, petitioned Howard County to rezone the former Woodmont property in Cooksville. The zoning application was dropped, but plans to move the Dar-us-Salaam facility from College Park to Cooksville proceeded as a conditional use.

References and notes

External links
 
 Articles about Woodmont Academy - Baltimore Sun
 BA 13-033C Al-Huda, Inc. t/a Dar-Us-Salaam – September 30, 2014 Banneker Room - Howard County
 In the Matter of Al Huda, Inc., T/A Dar-Us-Salaam Petitioner Before the Howard County Board of Appeals Hearing Examiner BA Case No. 13-033C
Cooksville, Maryland
Private schools in Howard County, Maryland
Educational institutions established in 1995
Educational institutions disestablished in 2011
1995 establishments in Maryland
2011 disestablishments in Maryland
Legion of Christ
Catholic schools in the United States
Regnum Christi